Stakhovsky is a Ukrainian surname. Notable people with the surname include:

Mykola Stakhovsky (1879–1948), Ukrainian diplomat, politic, medic
Sergiy Stakhovsky (born 1986), Ukrainian tennis player

Ukrainian-language surnames